Pieter Enneüs Heerma (born 5 August 1977, Amsterdam) is a Dutch politician. As a member of the Christian Democratic Appeal (CDA) he has been a member of the House of Representatives since 20 September 2012.

Biography 
From 1999 tot 2001 Heerma was a student assistant at Amsterdam School of Communication Research/ASCoR of the University of Amsterdam and the NIOD Institute for War, Holocaust and Genocide Studies researching the Srebrenica massacre. From 2002 to 2011 he was spokesman, press officer and head of press information of the CDA fraction in the House of Representatives. From 2011 to 2012 he was head of corporate communication of the health insurance company De Friesland Zorgverzekeraar.

Heerma was CDA campaign leader for the general election of 2012. He has been a member of the House of Representatives since 20 September 2012. Heerma was elected parliamentary leader of the Christian Democratic Appeal in the House of Representatives on 21 May 2019, following the nomination of Sybrand van Haersma Buma as Mayor of Leeuwarden.

Heerma studied political science at the Vrije Universiteit Amsterdam from 1995 tot 2001, with a specialization in political communication. He is married, has two sons and lives in Purmerend. He is the son of the late CDA leader Enneüs Heerma.

References
  Europa-nu.nl website
  House of Representatives website

External links
 

1977 births
Living people
21st-century Dutch politicians
Christian Democratic Appeal politicians
Dutch agnostics
Members of the House of Representatives (Netherlands)
Politicians from Amsterdam
People from Purmerend
Vrije Universiteit Amsterdam alumni